Alberto Capilla Pérez (12 December 1926 – 14 January 2003) was a Mexican diver. He competed at the 1952 Summer Olympics and the 1956 Summer Olympics.

Notes

References

External links
 

1926 births
2003 deaths
Mexican male divers
Olympic divers of Mexico
Divers at the 1952 Summer Olympics
Divers at the 1956 Summer Olympics
Divers from Paris